The Interagency Language Roundtable (ILR) is an unfunded organization comprising various agencies of the United States federal government with the purpose of coordinating and sharing information on foreign language activities at the federal level.

The ILR's primary function is to act as an avenue for the varying participating federal agencies to keep abreast of modern methods and technology regarding the teaching of language, the use of language, and any other language related issues.

Membership
The ILR membership consists of a large number of people with professional interest in language with regards to the teaching, learning, or use of language in a professional context. About 60% of the membership are federal employees.

Committees 
Aside from general membership, the ILR has three standing special interests committees:
Steering Committee
The Steering committee is responsible for planning ILR direction and events, and is composed of members from eight different federal agencies.
Testing Committee
Training Committee
Translation and Interpretation Committee.

Committees are chaired by federal employees from five different agencies.

Additionally, the ILR hosts the ILR Special Interest Group (SIG) on the Center for Advanced Study of Language (CASL). CASL SIG meetings, unlike ILR plenary meetings, are not open to general membership, allowing only federal representatives in attendance.

Joining the ILR
Any interested person may attend unrestricted ILR plenary meetings and events, requiring only two days' advance registration via the ILR home page. To become an ILR member, a person must first join their mailing list. Joining a specific committee requires only notifying a co-chair of the committee involved, and regularly attending meetings. Further details are listed on the ILR website. Membership is free.

Meetings
Plenary meetings are held monthly between September and June. Lectures and demonstrations on linguistic general interest topics are featured at every plenary meeting. Prior to each plenary meeting, each committee meets to discuss specific topics of interest. Some committee meetings are not open to general membership, due to coverage of certain topics of federal interest. These meetings' attendance restrictions are announced in advance.

Most plenary meetings boast between 75 and 100 attendees.

Officers
All officers of the ILR are volunteers who hold full-time federal positions elsewhere.

The Foreign Service Institute, the National Cryptologic School, and the Defense Language Institute lend additional minor clerical assistance.

Formation
The origins of the ILR can be traced back to 1955, when the Foreign Service Institute's Howard Sollenberger, the CIA's Clyde Sargent, and James Frith of the Air Force Language Program, conversed regarding the need for communication and coordination between federal agencies in training, policies, and practices of foreign languages.

Subsequent meetings included attendance by members of the local academic community as well as Charles Ferguson, Director of the Center for Applied Linguistics.

The ILR was formally institutionalized in 1973, after a study conducted by the General Accounting Office demonstrated the value of the organization.

Contributions to the field of linguistics
Since the 1950s, the ILR has made a number of contributions to the field of linguistics, both for American and foreign linguists, including, but not limited to:

ILR Proficiency Level Descriptions – This is a system of measuring the language proficiency of an individual, on a scale of 0 to 5. Proficiency level of 0 equates to no knowledge of a language, while the proficiency level of 5 equates to a highly educated foreigner or native speaker. Proficiency levels in excess of a whole number, but not reaching the next whole number are represented with the 'plus' sign, for example, a linguist who speaks at a near native level might be represented as having a 4+ level proficiency. (A similar system is used in the Userboxes of WP:Babel.)
ILR Translation Performance Skill Level Descriptions – Translation proficiency measurements based on the ILR Proficiency Level Descriptions, developed in 2005.
ILR Interpretation Performance Skill Level Descriptions – Interpretation proficiency measurements based on the ILR Translation Performance Skill Level Descriptions, developed in 2006.
Co-sponsorship with the National Virtual Translation Center of the "Languages of the World" website.
The development of a widely used interagency training manual for oral proficiency testing candidates.

See also
Defense Language Aptitude Battery
Defense Language Proficiency Tests
Center for Advanced Study of Language
ILR scale

References

External links
ILR Home Page
CASL Home Page
Languages of the World

Language education organizations
Language education in the United States
Linguistics organizations